The Chicago Film Society (CFS) is a not-for-profit organization dedicated to promoting and preserving celluloid film and celluloid film culture.  Widely known for historically informed screenings of 35mm, 70mm, 16mm and 8mm  films, the CFS also maintains a film archive and has collaborated on many film restorations.

Influence 
The Chicago Film Society plays an acknowledged role in Chicago's cultural life, with screenings frequently featured in prominent lists of highly recommended upcoming events.
Michael Phillips  of the Chicago Tribune has described them as "invaluable" and praised their "valiant, savvily curated" programming.
The Film Society was chosen by NewCity Film in 2017 to be among the "50 Chicago Screen Gems", and co-founder Becca Hall's involvement with the Chicago Film Society was highlighted in the 2012 "People Issue" of the Chicago Reader.

Projects 
The Chicago Film Society maintains a large archive of Leader Lady images, has collaborated on the restoration of the Robert Altman film "Corns-a-poppin",, cosponsors the annual Chicago Home Movie Day with the Chicago Film Archives and the Chicago Historical Society,
  and  received multiple National Film Preservation Foundation grants in 2019, 2020 and 2021.

References

External links 
Chicago Film Society Official Website

Non-profit organizations based in Chicago
Culture of Chicago